The National Investigative Service is the national investigation agency of Bulgaria for serious crimes and cooperation in international investigations. It was established in 2002, replacing the Specialized Investigation Service, which was founded in 1998. The National Investigative Service is currently headed by Borislav Sarafov, a former head of the Specialized Prosecutor's Offices of Appeals.

Director of the service
The director of the Service is appointed by the Supreme Judicial Council for a five-year term with the possibility of being selected again. He is the deputy of the Prosecutor General of Bulgaria in investigations by law.

The director is also deputy chief prosecutor.

References

External links
Official Website (in Bulgarian)

Law enforcement agencies of Bulgaria